Corruption in the United Kingdom, in the public sector, is defined by public servants using their office for private gain. Public sector corruption in the United Kingdom is perceived to be mostly rare, according to Transparency International's 2021 Corruption Perceptions Index (CPI) where the United Kingdom scored 78 on a scale from 0 ("highly corrupt") to 100 ("highly clean"); although Transparency International's own website details the damning true extent of corruption found in many areas of the UK, including parliament and the NHS. When ranked by score, the United Kingdom ranked number 11 among the 180 countries in the Index, where the country ranked number 1 is perceived to have the most honest public sector.

The United Kingdom currently has numerous laws that punish civil servants for bribery and other forms of corruption, with the Bribery Act 2010 currently the most relevant. Although the UK has long maintained a high rating in the Corruption Perceptions Index, public discontent as well as dissatisfaction has persisted . There has also been criticism from newspaper columnists. This has largely been because of the UK's fall from the top 10 in the CPI.

The Bribery Act 2010 is currently the most relevant law in the United Kingdom that punishes public and private bribery. The law does not make any distinction in sentencing between those who bribe (or are bribed) in the public or private sector.

See also 

 Crime in the United Kingdom

References  

United Kingdom